Jeremiah Donovan (October 18, 1857 – April 22, 1935) was a saloon owner and Democratic politician in Norwalk, Connecticut. He was a member of the Connecticut House of Representatives in 1903 and 1904. He served in the Connecticut Senate representing the 26th District from 1905 to 1909, and from 1911 to 1913. He served in the United States House of Representatives from Connecticut's 4th congressional district from 1913 to 1915. He was the 17th mayor of the city of Norwalk, Connecticut from 1917 to 1921.

Early life 
He was born in Ridgefield, Connecticut where he attended the public schools and was graduated from Ridgefield Academy. He moved to South Norwalk in 1870. He engaged in the retail liquor business until 1898 when he retired. His saloon at the corner of Washington and Water streets is still in business, now named Donovan's and Mackenzie's.

Political career 
Donovan was a member of the Norwalk city council and also served as deputy sheriff. Donovan was a delegate to the Democratic National Convention from 1896 to 1916. He was a member of the Connecticut House of Representatives in 1903 and 1904 and served in the Connecticut Senate 1905-1909. He was elected to the Sixty-third Congress from March 4, 1913 to March 3, 1915, but was an unsuccessful candidate for reelection in 1914 to the Sixty-fourth Congress.  He was the mayor of the city of Norwalk, Connecticut 1917-1921. He  retired before dying in Norwalk, Connecticut in 1935. He was buried at St. John's Cemetery.

References

External links 

1857 births
1935 deaths
Burials in Saint John's Cemetery (Norwalk, Connecticut)
Connecticut city council members
Democratic Party Connecticut state senators
Saloonkeepers
Mayors of Norwalk, Connecticut
Democratic Party members of the Connecticut House of Representatives
People from Ridgefield, Connecticut
Democratic Party members of the United States House of Representatives from Connecticut